Gizem Güreşen (born January 14, 1987) is a Turkish volleyball player.

Club career
He started volleyball in Ankara. He was trained in the infrastructure of VakıfBank Güneş Sigorta.

VakıfBank
Gizem Güreşen won the 2010–11 CEV Champions League with her team VakıfBank, and won the "Best Receiver" award.

Güreşen won the silver medal in the 2011 FIVB Women's Club World Championship playing in Doha, Qatar with VakıfBank. She was also awarded Best Libero.

Güreşen won the gold medal at the 2013 Club World Championship playing with Vakıfbank Istanbul.

Fenerbahçe
She was transferred to Fenerbahçe Grundig in the 2015–16 season.

Volero Zurich
In the 2016–17 season, she was transferred to Volero Zurich, a Swiss team. Gizem will play abroad for the first time.

Bursa Büyükşehir Belediyespor
She was transferred to Bursa Büyükşehir Belediyespor in the 2017–18 season.

Galatasaray (return)
On 6 December 2017, Galatasaray signed a 1.5-year contract with Güreşen at the signing ceremony held at the Ali Sami Yen Sports Complex Türk Telekom Stadium.

In the official statement made on 19 April 2021, Galatasaray HDI Sigorta Women's Volleyball Team signed a new 2-year contract with team captain Güreşen.

National team career
Güreşen won the Best Libero award and the silver medal at the 2011 European League, playing with her national team.

Personal life
On May 12, 2013, Gizem Güreşen married Hüseyin Karadayı, a well-known disc jockey in Turkey. They divorced in 2020.

Awards

Individuals
 2010–11 CEV Champions League Final Four "Best Libero"
 2010-11 Aroma Women's Volleyball League "Best Libero"
 2010-11 Aroma Women's Volleyball League "Best Receiver"
 2011 European League "Best Libero"
 2011 FIVB Women's Club World Championship "Best Libero" 2012-13 CEV Champions League "Best Libero"''

National team
 2009 Mediterranean Games -  Silver Medal
 2010 European League -  Bronze Medal
 2011 European League -  Silver Medal
 2011 Women's European Volleyball Championship -  Bronze Medal
 2012 FIVB World Grand Prix -  Bronze Medal
 2013 Mediterranean Games -  Silver Medal

Clubs
 2010-11 CEV Champions League -  Champion, with VakıfBank
 2011 FIVB Women's Club World Championship -  Runner-Up, with VakıfBank
 2011-12 Aroma Women's Volleyball League -  Runner-Up, with VakıfBank
 2012-13 Turkish Cup -  Champion, with VakıfBank
 2012–13 CEV Champions League -  Champion, with VakıfBank
 2012-13 Turkish Women's Volleyball League -  Champion, with Vakıfbank Spor Kulübü
 2013 Club World Championship -  Champion, with Vakıfbank Istanbul
 2013-15 Turkish Super Cup -  Champion, with Fenerbahçe Grundig

References

External links

 FIVB Profile
 Player profile at Galatasaray.org
 Player profile at Volleybox.net
 
 
 
 

1987 births
Living people
Turkish women's volleyball players
Turkish expatriate sportspeople in Switzerland
VakıfBank S.K. volleyballers
Türk Telekom volleyballers
Galatasaray S.K. (women's volleyball) players
Olympic volleyball players of Turkey
Volleyball players at the 2012 Summer Olympics
Volleyball players at the 2015 European Games
Mediterranean Games medalists in volleyball
Mediterranean Games silver medalists for Turkey
Competitors at the 2009 Mediterranean Games
Competitors at the 2013 Mediterranean Games
Turkey women's international volleyball players
European Games medalists in volleyball
European Games gold medalists for Turkey